Gertrud Bacher (married name Schöpf; born 28 February 1971 in Meran) is a retired Italian heptathlete.

Biography
She is Italian record-women of the heptathlon. She won two medals, at individual level, at the International athletics competitions. She competed in the 2000 Summer Olympics.

Achievements

Personal bests
200 Metres 24.23 0.4 Desenzano del Garda 08 05 1999 
400 Metres 55.79 Cles 23 08 2001 
800 Metres 2:08.09 Sevilla 22 08 1999 
100 Metres Hurdles 13.65 0.8 Desenzano del Garda 08 05 1999 
High Jump 1.78 Alzano Lombard 29 05 1993 
Long Jump 6.11 0.8 Bydgoszcz 30 06 2002 
Shot Put 14.64 
Lana 23 06 2004
Javelin Throw 48.14 Rieti 02 08 2003 
Heptathlon 6185 Desenzano del Garda 09 05 1999

National titles
She won 10 times the individual national championship.
5 wins in the heptathlon track (1997, 1998, 2001, 2002, 2003)
5 wins in the women's pentathlon indoor (1995, 1999, 2002, 2003, 2004)

See also
 Italian records in athletics
 Italian all-time lists - Heptathlon

References

External links
 

1971 births
Living people
Sportspeople from Merano
Italian female pentathletes
Italian heptathletes
Athletes (track and field) at the 2000 Summer Olympics
Olympic athletes of Italy
World Athletics Championships athletes for Italy
Mediterranean Games silver medalists for Italy
Mediterranean Games medalists in athletics
Athletes (track and field) at the 1997 Mediterranean Games
Athletes (track and field) at the 2001 Mediterranean Games
21st-century Italian women